Osos de Toluca (English: Toluca Bears) were an American football team based in Toluca, Mexico. The Osos competed in the Central Division of the Liga de Fútbol Americano Profesional, the top American football league in Mexico. During its existence, the team never made it to playoffs.

History
The team was founded on 4 September 2018, as the second team of the 2019 Liga de Fútbol Americano Profesional expansion (the other being the Artilleros), and the eight team overall in the LFA.

The name of the team refers to the mexican grizzly bear, today extinct. As a curious fact, Toluca already had two sports teams with the name of Osos (Spanish for "bears"): a baseball team, Osos Negros de Toluca (Toluca Black Bears) and a football team, Osos Grises (Gray Bears); both teams are now defunct.

On 17 September 2018, Horacio García Aponte, college national champion in 2017 with Borregos Salvajes Toluca, was named head coach of the team.

In their debut season, the team won only two games, finishing the regular season with a 2–6 record and as the last overall classified team.

In July 2020, head coach Horacio García left the team.

The team folded in January 2022, prior to the beginning of the 2022 LFA season.

Stadium
The Osos played their home games at the Universidad Siglo XXI. The university's field was conditioned with stands so it could seat 4,000 people.

Roster

Staff

Season-by-season

References

2018 establishments in Mexico
American football teams established in 2018
Defunct American football teams in Mexico
Toluca
Sports teams in the State of Mexico